Vitaliy Bort is a former People's Deputy of Ukraine and a member of the Party of Regions (since May 2006).

Biography

Vitaliy Petrovych Bort was born on 1 September 1972 in Donetsk. In 1994, Bort graduated from Donetsk Polytechnic University (Horlovka branch) in the faculty of the Construction of Roads and Bridges.

Career

 1995–2000 - Commercial agent at Donetskelectrotorg LLC
 2005 - Manager at Trading House Yasinovatskiy Machine Building Plant
 2005–2006 - Commercial Director at Trading House Yasinovatskiy Machine Building Plant
 2006–2007 - People's Deputy of Ukraine from the Party of Regions of the 5th convocation
 Since 2006 - Chairman of the Subcommittee of the roads and road management of the Committee on Communications and Transport 
 Since 2007 - People's Deputy of Ukraine from the Party of Regions of the 6th convocation (No. 101 in the electoral list)
 Since December 2007 - Member of the Committee on Agrarian Policy and Land Relations
 Since December 2012 - Chairman of the Subcommittee on pipelines of the Committee on Communications and Transport
 Since March 2013 - Member of the Parliamentary group of the Verkhovna Rada of Ukraine on Interparliamentary Relations with the Kingdom of Norway
 Since March 2013 - Member of the Parliamentary group of the Verkhovna Rada of Ukraine on Interparliamentary Relations with the Russian Federation
 Since April 2013 - Member of the Parliamentary group of the Verkhovna Rada of Ukraine on Interparliamentary Relations with the Islamic Republic of Pakistan
 Since May 2013 - Member of the Parliamentary group of the Verkhovna Rada of Ukraine on Interparliamentary Relations with the Republic of Kazakhstan

In the 2014 parliamentary election, Bort sought re-election to parliament for a constituency seat in Makiyivka; this time as a non-partisan candidate. At that time, the constituency was held by pro-Russian insurgents during the War in Donbass and the elections did not take place.

Family

Bort is married; his wife Olga (born 1973) is a housewife. They have one daughter, Yana, born in 1996.

References 

1972 births
Businesspeople from Donetsk
Politicians from Donetsk
Living people
Party of Regions politicians
Fifth convocation members of the Verkhovna Rada
Sixth convocation members of the Verkhovna Rada
Seventh convocation members of the Verkhovna Rada